John Irving (May 24, 1953 – April 12, 2015) was an American college basketball player best known for his career at Hofstra, which lasted from 1974–75 to 1976–77. He also spent one season (1972–73) at Arizona before transferring. He holds career per-game averages of 13.2 points and 15.4 rebounds at the school, and is the last Hofstra player to average a double-digit number of rebounds in three consecutive seasons. He led NCAA Division I in rebounding during his sophomore year of 1974–75 with a 15.3 per-game average. Irving was a member of two NCAA Tournament teams, and after he graduated was selected in the third round (58th overall) by the Detroit Pistons in the 1977 NBA draft, although he never played in the league. Previously, he was also selected by the Phoenix Suns in the ninth round (150th overall) in 1976. He is still only one of two players in Hofstra University history to accumulate both 1,000 points and 1,000 rebounds during his career (Bill Thieben is the other), and has been honored as an inductee in the school's Athletics Hall of Fame as part of the 2011 class.

After college, Irving played for the Toyota Tamaraws in the Philippine Basketball Association, helping the team win the 1977 Invitational Championships, then in Anderlecht (Belgium), before playing three years in Israel for Elitzur Tel Aviv and Beitar Tel Aviv. He then moved to England for a year before playing for Ahrend Donar in the Netherlands.

See also
 List of NCAA Division I men's basketball season rebounding leaders

References

1953 births
2015 deaths
American expatriate basketball people in the Philippines
American expatriate basketball people in Israel
American expatriate basketball people in the United Kingdom
American expatriate basketball people in Belgium
American men's basketball players
Arizona Wildcats men's basketball players
Basketball players from Wilmington, Delaware
Centers (basketball)
Detroit Pistons draft picks
Hofstra Pride men's basketball players
Philippine Basketball Association imports
Phoenix Suns draft picks
Power forwards (basketball)
Toyota Super Corollas players